Isanguele (Archibong) is a commune and arrondissement in the Ndian département, Southwest Province, western Cameroon.Located on the Akpa Yafe River, it is a small fishing community.

See also
Communes of Cameroon

References
Ministry of Territorial Administration and Decentralization - Southwest province

Communes of Southwest Region (Cameroon)